Óscar Gilberto Arizaga (born 20 August 1957) is a Peruvian football midfielder who played for Peru in the 1982 FIFA World Cup. He also played for Atlético Chalaco.

References

External links

FIFA profile

1957 births
Living people
Association football midfielders
Peruvian footballers
Peru international footballers
Atlético Chalaco footballers
1982 FIFA World Cup players